Chingford Mount Cemetery is a cemetery in Chingford Mount, in the London Borough of Waltham Forest.

The main entrance is opposite Chingford Old Church. Opened in May 1884, 41½ acres in size, it was laid out on the site of the house and grounds of Caroline Mount. Chingford Mount Cemetery was opened as a sister-site to the already established Abney Park Cemetery, which had opened in 1840 as part of the  Magnificent Seven Cemeteries which circled London.

Abney Park opened in response to the burial conditions of cemeteries in the inner city. Originally a joint-stock company and inheriting the mantle of Bunhill Fields, the company was made over in 1884 and run as a commercial venture. Chingford Mount was the first new site to open under this regime, followed by Hendon Park and Greenford. Following the collapse of the managing company in the 1970s, plans were submitted to turn over unused parts of the burial ground for redevelopment as housing. Objections from local residents halted this plan and the cemetery is now under the care of the London Borough of Waltham Forest.

Among those buried in the cemetery are sculptor John Bacon, the Kray twins and other members of their crime family, the meteorologist John William Tripe, and Benjamin Pollock, founder of Pollock's Toy Museum and Benjamin Pollock's Toy Shop. The cemetery contains the war graves of 139 Commonwealth service personnel of World War I and 182 of World War II, with the names of those whose graves have no headstones being listed on a low screen wall surrounding the War Graves Plot in Section F13.

References

External links

 

1884 establishments in England
Cemeteries in London
Chingford
Burials at Chingford Mount Cemetery